Litíč is a municipality and village in Trutnov District in the Hradec Králové Region of the Czech Republic. It has about 200 inhabitants.

Administrative parts
The village of Nouzov is an administrative part of Litíč.

Notable people
Franz Xaver Wagenschön (1726–1790), German painter

References

Villages in Trutnov District